Acleris bacurana is a species of moth of the family Tortricidae. It is found in Libya.

References

Moths described in 1934
bacurana
Moths of Africa